Bethphage or Bethsphage, is a Christian religious site on the Mount of Olives east of historical Jerusalem.

Bethphage is mentioned in the New Testament as the place in ancient Israel from which Jesus sent his disciples to find a colt upon which he would ride into Jerusalem. The Synoptic Gospels mention it as being close to Bethany, where he was staying immediately prior to his triumphal entry into Jerusalem.

However, another possibility, based on the writings of Catholic nun Anne Catherine Emmerich, would place it in the valley east of as-Sawahira ash-Sharqiya, since, she writes, "Going up from Bethphage to the Mount of Olives, one could see, through the high hills that bordered the route on either side, the Temple standing opposite," a vista possible only from Abu Dis.   She describes, "It lay on low, swampy ground, and was a poor little place consisting of only a row of houses on either side of the road." Ancient Bethany would then have to be further east than Bethphage, yet in close proximity to Jerusalem, as well as in the vicinity of 'Arab al-Jahalin or Ma'ale Adumim.

Unknown villagers living there, the owners of the colt according to Gospel of Luke 19:33, permitted Jesus' disciples to take the colt away for Jesus' triumphal entry into Jerusalem, which would have been four days before Passover. There is an annual Palm Sunday walk into Jerusalem which begins in Bethphage.

Eusebius (Onom 58:13) located it on the Mount of Olives. It was likely on the road from Jerusalem to Jericho and the limit of a Sabbath-day's journey from Jerusalem, i.e., 2000 cubits. There is the Franciscan Church of Bethphage at a likely location.

References

New Testament places
New Testament Aramaic words and phrases